The 1929 Regis Rangers football team was an American football team that represented Regis College as an independent during the 1929 college football season. In their second season under head coach Red Strader, the Rangers compiled a 3–7 record and outscored opponents by a total of 156 to 153.

Schedule

References

Regis
Regis Rangers football seasons
Regis Rangers football